Fair Meadows Race Track is a large race track and betting center located in Tulsa, Oklahoma. The track features live horse races Thursday through Sunday from early June to late July at its facility at Expo Square Pavilion in the Tulsa State Fairgrounds.

While the Expo Square is known for the annual Chili Bowl Midget Nationals & Tulsa Shootout races in the Expo Center, the Fair Meadows Race Track has hosted some motorsports events as well. It hosted 2 USAC Silver Crown Champ Car Series events in 2003 & 2004 on the mile.

References

External links
 Fair Meadows Official Website
 Fair Meadows Simulcast Information http://exposquare.com/simulcast/
 Fair Meadows Live Race Information http://exposquare.com/liverace/
 Expo Square's Official Website http://www.exposquare.com/

Sports in Tulsa, Oklahoma
Horse racing venues in Oklahoma
Tulsa State Fair